Lu Zhuguo (12 October 1928 – 1 December 2022) was a Chinese screenwriter and writer.

Career
In 1951, Lu became the chief editor of PLA Literature and Art. In 1958, he entered 1 August Studio. In 1977, Lu won Xia Yan Film Literary Prize. In 2005, China Film Literature Society honored him with Lifetime Achievement Award.

Selected filmography

References

External links

1928 births
2022 deaths
Screenwriters from Henan
People of the Republic of China
People's Republic of China writers
Writers from Luoyang
20th-century screenwriters
21st-century screenwriters
20th-century Chinese writers
21st-century Chinese writers
20th-century Chinese male writers
21st-century Chinese male writers
Male screenwriters